The .510 DTC EUROP is a French rifle cartridge developed by Eric Danis in order to comply with firearms legislation of .50 BMG rifles in Europe. In response to the .50 Caliber BMG Regulation Act of 2004, which banned future sales of .50 BMG shoulder-fired rifles in California, long-range shooters in that state have begun to adopt this cartridge as a manner of following the new legislation.

The .510 DTC EUROP uses the same bullet as the .50 BMG, but has slightly different case dimensions.  The case is  shorter and uses a steeper shoulder than standard .50 BMG ammunition. .510 DTC cases can be made by shortening and then fire-forming .50 BMG cases. The new round has almost identical ballistics, but because of the different dimensions, rifles chambered for the .50 BMG cannot safely fire the .510 DTC, and vice versa, and therefore do not fall under the same legal prohibitions. .510 DTC rifles, like .50 BMG rifles outside California, are simply standard modern rifles and can be purchased as such.

External links
 Cartridge Comparison Picture
 Chamber Reamer Drawing 

Pistol and rifle cartridges
12.7 mm firearms